The El Maghara mine is an underground coal mine in Egypt's Sinai peninsula. Opened in 1964, the mine produces low-rank bituminous coal. Located about 250 km northeast of Cairo, it is the only coal mine in Egypt. Operations were approved to resume in 2014, with reserves estimated at 21 million tons of coal.

The mine is run by the state-owned .

References 

Coal mines in Egypt
Coal mines
1964 establishments in Egypt